The 2007 BMW Open was a men's tennis tournament that was part of the 2007 ATP Tour. It was the 92nd edition of the event and was played on outdoor clay courts in Munich, Germany between 30 April and 6 May 2007. The tournament was won by Philipp Kohlschreiber in men's singles and Philipp Kohlschreiber and Mikhail Youzhny in men's doubles.

Finals

Singles

 Philipp Kohlschreiber defeated  Mikhail Youzhny, 2–6, 6–3, 6–4

Doubles

 Philipp Kohlschreiber /  Mikhail Youzhny defeated  Jan Hájek /  Jaroslav Levinský, 6–1, 6–4

References

External links
Association of Tennis Professionals (ATP) – tournament profile